Terje Breivik (born 24 March 1965) is a Norwegian politician and entrepreneur. He served as the second deputy leader of the Liberal party from 2012 to 2020. He is the former Mayor of the municipality of Ulvik. Prior to becoming deputy leader in 2012, he served in the capacity as secretary-general of the Liberal Party since 2004.

He was elected to the position after the former deputy leader Helge Solum Larsen was indicted on rape charges against a youth party member.

References

1965 births
Living people
People from Ulvik
Liberal Party (Norway) politicians
Mayors of places in Hordaland
21st-century Norwegian politicians